The Edson River is a minor river in west-central Alberta, Canada.  The river, like the nearby town of Edson, is named for Edson Joseph Chamberlin (1852–1924), a Vice-President and General Manager of the Grand Trunk Pacific Railway. Chamberlain also acted as the President of the Grand Trunk Railway.

Course
The Edson flows east south-east from its origin in the hills north of Highway 16. It takes on a number of small creeks, and is bridged by the Emerson Lake Haul Road, a multi-use road originally developed by the oil and gas industry. The Edson is bridged twice by Alberta Highway 748 before flowing in to the Mcleod River near Wolf Creek, Alberta.

Fish
Fish found in the Edson River, near its confluence with the Mcleod River, include sturgeon, rainbow trout, Arctic grayling, mountain whitefish, and brown trout.

Tributaries
Bench Creek

See also
List of Alberta rivers

References

Edson, Alberta
Rivers of Alberta